Mont-Terrible  was a department of the First French Republic, with its seat at Porrentruy.

The department was created in 1793 with the annexation of the short-lived Rauracian Republic, which had been created in December 1792 from a part of the Prince-Bishopric of Basel.

In 1797, the former Württemberg-owned Principality of Montbéliard, which had previously been given to Haute-Saône, was reattached to Mont-Terrible, together with the remaining Swiss part of the Bishopric of Basel after the French attack to the Elvetic nation.

The department was abolished in 1800. Its territory was annexed to the Haut-Rhin, within which it formed the two arrondissements of Delémont and Porrentruy.

In 1815, the territory that had previously formed Mont-Terrible was partitioned between Doubs (Montbéliard) and the Swiss canton of Bern (now forming the canton of Jura and the Bernese Jura).

Creation 
The Department was created on 23 March 1793 by the National Convention which decreed the French Republic and the Country of Porrentruy to be reunited under the name of the Department of Mont-Terrible.

 — The Country of Porrentruy will form a special department, under the name of Department of Mont-Terrible.
 — The commissioners of the National Convention, sent in this country by decree of 10 February, are responsible for taking all necessary measures to ensure the enforcement of the laws of the Republic, and to forward to the Convention all information necessary to determine the organisation and division of this department.
 —The Provisional Executive Council is responsible for reducing [customs] barriers, taking all necessary precautions to prevent exports in contravention of the laws of the Republic.

References 

Former departments of France in Switzerland
Former departments of France in France
Canton of Jura
1793 establishments in France